KMSN may refer to:

 Dane County Regional Airport, Wisconsin, United States (ICAO code: KMSN)
 KMSN (FM), a radio station (104.1 FM) licensed to serve Mason, Texas, United States